The Light SEAL Support Craft (LSSC), was a fast riverine assault boat developed by the United States Navy for use by the United States Navy SEALs in the Vietnam War in 1968.

History
In July 1968 the LSSC began replacing the Patrol Boat, River as the primary vessel for SEAL team riverine operations.

The LSSC was later developed into the Strike Assault Boat which entered service in 1970.

References

Riverine warfare
Vietnam War ships
Military boats